The history of the Haber process begins with the invention of the Haber process at the dawn of the twentieth century. The process allows the economical fixation of atmospheric dinitrogen in the form of ammonia, which in turn allows for the industrial synthesis of various explosives and nitrogen fertilizers, and is probably the most important industrial process developed during the twentieth century.

Well before the start of the industrial revolution, farmers would fertilize the land in various ways, mainly using feces and urine, well aware of the benefits of an intake of essential nutrients for plant growth. Although it was frowned upon, farmers took it upon themselves to fertilize their fields using natural means and remedies that had been passed down from generation to generation. The 1840s works of Justus von Liebig identified nitrogen as one of these important nutrients. Over time children used to play in the fields and farmers reckoned that that was the reason that their children were so strong. The same chemical compound could already be converted to nitric acid, the precursor of gunpowder and powerful explosives like TNT and nitroglycerine. Scientists also already knew that nitrogen formed the dominant portion of the atmosphere, but manmade chemistry had yet to establish a means to fix it.

Then, in 1909, German chemist Fritz Haber successfully fixed atmospheric nitrogen in a laboratory. This success had extremely attractive military, industrial and agricultural applications. In 1913, barely five years later, a research team from BASF, led by Carl Bosch, developed the first industrial-scale application of the Haber process, sometimes called the Haber–Bosch process.

The industrial production of nitrogen prolonged World War I by providing Germany with the gunpowder and explosives necessary for the war effort even though it no longer had access to guano. During the interwar period, the lower cost of ammonia extraction from the virtually inexhaustible atmospheric reservoir contributed to the development of intensive agriculture and provided support for worldwide population growth. During World War II, the efforts to industrialize the Haber process benefited greatly from the Bergius process, allowing Nazi Germany access to the synthesized fuel produced by IG Farben, thereby decreasing oil imports.

In the early twenty-first century, the effectiveness of the Haber process (and its analogues) is such that more than 99% of global demand for synthetic ammonia, a demand which exceeds 100 million tons annually, is satisfied thereby. Nitrogen fertilizers and synthetic products, such as urea and ammonium nitrate, are mainstays of industrial agriculture, and are essential to the nourishment of at least two billion people. Industrial facilities using the Haber process (and its analogues) have a significant ecological impact. Half of the nitrogen in the great quantities of synthetic fertilizers employed today is not assimilated by plants but finds its way into rivers and the atmosphere as volatile chemical compounds.

El Dorado made of nitrogen
For several centuries, farmers knew that certain nutrients were essential for plant growth. In different parts of the world, farmers developed different methods of fertilizing the farmland. In China, human waste was scattered in rice fields. In nineteenth-century Europe, gangs of English graverobbers roamed the Continent, searching for skeletons to grind into phosphate fertilizer. Justus von Liebig (1803 – 1873), German chemist and founder of industrial agriculture, claimed that England had "stolen" 3.5 million skeletons from Europe to obtain phosphorus for fertilizer. In Paris, as many as one million tons of horse dung was collected annually to fertilize city gardens. Throughout the nineteenth century, bison bones from the American West were brought back to East Coast factories for the production of phosphorus and phosphate fertilizer.

From the 1820s to the 1860s, the Chincha Islands of Peru were exploited for their high quality guano deposits, which they exported to the United States, France and the United Kingdom. The guano-boom increased economic activity in Peru considerably for a few decades until all 12.5 million tons of guano deposits were exhausted.

Research was initiated to find alternative sources of fertilizer. The Atacama Desert, at that time part of Peru, was home to significant amounts of saltpeter (sodium nitrate). At the time of the discovery of these deposits, the saltpeter had limited agricultural use. Then chemists successfully developed a process to purify the saltpeter in order to produce gunpowder. The saltpeter was also converted into nitric acid, the precursor of powerful explosives, such as nitroglycerine and dynamite. As exports from this region increased, tensions between Peru and its neighbors increased as well.

In 1879, Bolivia, Chile, and Peru went to war over possession of Atacama Desert, the so-called "Saltpeter War". Bolivian forces were quickly defeated by the Chileans. In 1881, Chile defeated Peru and seized control of nitrate exploitation in the Atacama Desert. Consumption of Chilean saltpeter for agriculture quickly grew and Chileans standard of living rose significantly.

Technological developments in Europe brought an end to these days. In the twentieth century, the minerals from this region "contribute[d] minimally to global nitrogen supply."

A pressing need
In the late nineteenth century, chemists, including William Crookes, President of the British Association for the Advancement of Science in 1898, predicted that the demand for nitrogen compounds, either in the form of fertilizer or explosives, would exceed supply in the near future.

Following the work by Claude Louis Berthollet published in 1784, chemists knew ammonia to be a nitrogen compound. Early attempts to synthesize ammonia were performed in 1795 by Georg Friedrich Hildebrandt. Several others were made during the nineteenth century.

In the 1870s, ammonia was an unwanted byproduct of making manufactured gas. Its importance emerged later, and in the 1900s the industry modified their facilities to produce it from coke. Still, production could not meet demand. For example, in 1910, production of fixed nitrogen from coke ovens totaled 230,000 tonnes, while Chile exported around 370,000 metric tonnes.

In 1900, Chile, with its deposits of saltpeter, produced two-thirds of all fertilizer on the planet. However, these deposits rapidly diminished, the industry was dominated by an oligopoly and the cost of saltpeter rose constantly. To ensure food security for Europe's growing population, it was essential that a new economical and reliable method of obtaining ammonia be developed.

Issues of food security were particularly acute in Germany. Its soil was poor and the country lacked an empire. A major consumer of Chilean saltpeter, Germany saltpeter imports totaled 350,000 tonnes in 1900. Twelve years later, it imported 900,000 tonnes. The United States was in much better position due to the Guano Islands Act.

In the years between 1890 and 1900, chemistry advanced on several fronts, and more scientists attempted to fix atmospheric nitrogen. In 1895, German chemists Adolf Frank and Nikodem Caro succeeded in reacting calcium carbide with dinitrogen to obtain calcium cyanamide, a chemical compound used as a fertilizer. Industrialization of the Frank-Caro process began in 1905. By 1918, there were 35 synthesis sites fixing 325,000 tonnes of nitrogen annually.  However, the Cyanamide process consumed large amounts of electrical power and was more labor-intensive than the Haber process. Today, cyanamide is used primarily as a herbicide.

Wilhelm Ostwald, considered one of the best German chemists of the early twentieth century, attempted to synthesize ammonia in 1900 using an invention. He interested BASF, who asked Carl Bosch, a recently hired chemist, to validate the device. After several tests, Bosch concluded the ammonia came from the device itself, not the atmosphere. Ostwald challenged this conclusion, but conceded when Bosch offered proof.

In 1901, Henry Le Chatelier managed to synthesize ammonia from air. After obtaining a patent, he claimed it was possible to obtain better performance by increasing the pressure. When one of his assistants was killed following the accidental explosion of a device, Le Chatelier decided to end his research.

Americans Bradley and Lovejoy, specialists in electrochemistry, developed a method of producing nitric acid using electric arcs. The industrial manufacture of nitric acid using this method began in 1902. Their company soon closed in 1904, as the consumption of electricity made production costs too great.

In 1905, Norwegian physicist Kristian Birkeland, funded by engineer and industrialist Samuel Eyde, developed the Birkeland–Eyde process which fixes atmospheric nitrogen as nitrogen oxides. The Birkeland–Eyde process requires a considerable amount of electricity, constraining possible site location; fortunately, Norway possessed several sites capable of meeting these needs. Norsk Hydro was founded 2 December 1905 to commercialize the new process. In 1911, the Norsk Hydro facility was consuming 50,000 kW, the next year, consumption doubled to 100,000 kW. By 1913, Norsk Hydro's facilities were producing 12,000 tonnes of nitrogen,  about 5 percent of the volume extracted from coke at the time.

Similar processes were developed at the time. Schönherr, an employee of BASF, worked on a nitrogen fixation process beginning in 1905. In 1919, Schönherr's Badische process was employed at Norsk Hydro facilities. That same year, the Pauling process was used in Germany and the United States.

All these methods were quickly supplanted by the less-expensive Haber process.

A new approach
In 1905, German chemist Fritz Haber published Thermodynamik technischer Gasreaktionen (The Thermodynamics of Technical Gas Reactions), a book more concerned about the industrial application of chemistry than to its theoretical study. In it, Haber inserted the results of his study of the equilibrium equation of ammonia:

 (g) + 3  (g)  2  (g) - ΔH

At 1000 °C in the presence of an iron catalyst, "small" amounts of ammonia were produced from dinitrogen and dihydrogen gas. These results discouraged his further pursuit in this direction. However, in 1907, spurred by a scientific rivalry between Haber and Walther Nernst, nitrogen fixation became Haber's first priority. A few years later, Haber used results published by Nernst on the chemical equilibrium of ammonia and his own familiarity with high pressure chemistry and the liquefaction of air, to develop a new nitrogen fixation process. He had no precise information on the parameters to impose on the system, but at the conclusion of his research, he was able to establish that an effective ammonia production system must:

 operate at high pressure (on the order of 20 MPa);
 implement one or more catalysts to accelerate the synthesis of ammonia;
 operate at a high temperature (between 500 °C and 600 °C) to obtain the best efficiency in the presence of the catalyst;
 since about 5% of the N2 and H2 molecules react with each passage in the chemical reactor:
 separate the ammonia from the other molecules by liquefaction,
 withdraw ammonia continuously,
 inject the N2 and H2 that did not react into the chemical reactor again;
 recycle the heat produced.

To overcome the problems associated with high pressure, Haber called upon the talents of Robert Le Rossignol, who designed the equipment necessary for the success of the process. Early in 1909, Haber discovered that osmium could serve as a catalyst. Later, he established that uranium could also act as a catalyst.  Haber also obtained good results with iron, nickel, manganese and calcium. In the chemical equation shown above, the direct reaction is exothermic. This heat can be used to heat the reagents before they enter the chemical reactor. Haber's team developed a system that recycles the heat produced.

In March 1909, Haber demonstrated to his laboratory colleagues that he had finally found a process capable of fixing atmospheric dinitrogen sufficient to consider its industrialization.

While BASF took out a patent on the Haber process, August Bernthsen, director of research at BASF, doubted the utility of it. He did not believe that BASF wanted to engage in such a project. According to Bernthsen, no industrial device was capable of withstanding such high pressure and temperature for a long enough period to pay off the investment. In addition, it appeared to him that the catalytic potential of osmium could disappear with use, which required its regular replacement despite the metal being scarce on Earth.

However, Carl Engler, a chemist and university professor, wrote to BASF President Heinrich von Brunck to convince him to talk to Haber. Von Brunck, along with Bernthsen and Carl Bosch, went to Haber's laboratory to determine whether BASF should engage in industrialization of the process. When Bernthsen learned that he needed devices capable of supporting at least 100 atm (about 10 MPa), he exclaimed, "One hundred atmospheres! Just yesterday an autoclave at seven atmospheres exploded on us!" Before deciding, von Brunck asked for Bosch's advice.

The latter had already worked in metallurgy, and his father had installed a mechanical workshop at home where the young Carl had learned to handle different tools. He had been working for several years on nitrogen fixation, without having obtained any significant results. He knew that processes that used electric arc furnaces, such as the Birkeland–Eyde process, required huge amounts of electricity, making them economically nonviable outside Norway. To continue to grow, BASF had to find a more economical method of fixing. Bosch said, "I think it can work. I know exactly what the steel industry can do. We should risk it."

In July 1909, BASF employees came to check on Haber's success again: the laboratory equipment fixed the nitrogen from the air, in the form of liquid ammonia, at a rate of about 250 milliliters every two hours. BASF decided to industrialize the process, although it was associated with Norsk Hydro to operate the Schönherr process. Carl Bosch, future head of industrialization of the process, reported that the key factor that prompted BASF to embark on this path was the improvement of the efficiency of the catalyst.

Notes

Bibliography 
 
  
 
 
 
 
 
 
 
 
 
 
 
 
 
 

History of chemistry
Fritz Haber